KSM was an American rock band from Los Angeles, California that was active from 2006 to 2010. The band consisted of lead singer Shelby Cobra (real last name Spalione), lead guitarist Shae Padilla, rhythm guitarist Katie Cecil, bassist Sophia Melon and drummer Kate Cabebe.

They gained popularity in summer 2009 when they covered the song, "I Want You to Want Me" by Cheap Trick. The song was used to promote the television series 10 Things I Hate About You on the ABC Family network.

History

2006–2008: Formation
KSM was formed in a joint project between The Walt Disney Company and former chart-topping girl band The Go-Go's. The Go-Go's were looking for an all-girl pop band to mentor and held auditions in 2006. Four musicians (Padilla, Cecil, Cabebe, and Melon; all age 13-15 at the time) were selected and the group was originally developed as a Go-Go's cover band called the Po-Go's. Disney planned to replicate its success with Devo 2.0, a kids' version of the '80s new wave band Devo, with the possibility of the Po-Go's appearing in a movie or TV series. Eventually the band's sound was changed from pop to rock, and with the addition of lead singer Shelby Cobra (real last name Spalione) in February 2008, they changed their name to KSM. Around that time, the Go-Go's ended their involvement with the project.

2009–2010: Read Between the Lines and disbandment
KSM were signed with Walt Disney Records (part of the Disney Music Group) and promoted through various Disney endeavors. They toured as an opening act for fellow Disney recording artists Mitchel Musso, Demi Lovato, and Jonas Brothers, as well as opening for Paramore and David Archuleta. KSM's journey as they approached and then supported the release of their debut album was documented in the bi-weekly reality web series called, KSM: Read Between the Lines which aired from August 10, 2009 to October 16, 2009 on www.teen.com. The 20-episode web series was produced by The Disney Music Group and The Jonas Group. On September 22, 2009, KSM released their debut album Read Between the Lines, which was written and produced by Matthew Gerrard and Robbie Nevil.  KSM performed on Good Morning America on October 8, 2009 and on The Rachael Ray Show on October 12, 2009.

The band confirmed in April 2010 that bassist Sophia Melon departed to attend Barnard College. In August 2010 KSM confirmed that they had broken up to pursue separate careers. In October 2010, lead guitarist Shae Padilla formed a new hard rock band called Rixy Fisk, which briefly included Shelby Spalione (no longer using the "Cobra" stage name) on vocals. Padilla's band was later called FireSky, which released the EP Erase the Enemy in August 2011. Drummer Kate Cabebe attended California Lutheran University and has worked for Cambio.com as a correspondent. Spalione released the dance-pop single "Overrated Friday" under the name Lio in late 2011 and again under the name Shelby in early 2012; she has also performed with will.i.am. Rhythm guitarist Katie Cecil had been a child actress before KSM, and earned small roles in the TV series Medium, Criminal Minds, and Help Me Help You. Starting in 2015, Cecil is lead singer for the indie-pop band Wayfarers.

Band members
Former band members
 Shelby Cobra — Lead vocals
 Shae Padilla — Lead guitar
 Katie Cecil —  Rhythm guitar, backing vocals
 Sophia Melon — Bass guitar, backing vocals
 Kate Cabebe — Drums

Discography

Studio releases
Read Between the Lines (DisneySound, 2009)
I Want You To Want Me (Walt Disney Records/DisneySound, 2009) - one-track promo CD
KSM Live at the Filmore New York at Irving Plaza [Live Nation Studios] (DisneySound)

Soundtrack and compilation appearances
 "Hero In You" from Disney Girlz Rock, Vol. 2 (Walt Disney Records, 2008)
 "Don't Rain On My Parade" from Jim's Picks 2009 2XCD (Universal/Fontana, 2008)
 "Distracted" and "Meet The Band" from Radio Disney Jams, Vol. 11 (Walt Disney Records, 2009)
 "Magic Carpet Ride" from Wizards of Waverly Place (Walt Disney Records, 2009)
 "Magic Carpet Ride" from Music from Cats & Dogs: The Revenge of Kitty Galore (Original Motion Picture Soundtack) (Water Tower Music, 2010)
 "Good Enough" from DisneyMania 7 (Walt Disney Records, 2010)
 "Read Between The Lines" from It's Teen-Disney (Som Livre Disney, 2010)

Music videos

Filmography

Concert tours
Co-headlining
 The Tour of Gymnastics Superstars –  (2008)

Opening act
 The Cheetah Girls – One World Tour (2008)
 Demi Lovato – Demi Lovato: Live in Concert (2009)
 Honor Society – Full Moon Crazy Tour (2009)

References

External links

All-female punk bands
Hollywood Records artists
Rock music groups from California
Musical quintets
Musical groups disestablished in 2010
Musical groups from Los Angeles
Musical groups established in 2006
2006 establishments in California